Srdjan Muskatirovic (born 10 April 1972) is a former tennis player from Yugoslavia, who represented his native country as a qualifier at the 1992 Summer Olympics in Barcelona, where he was defeated in the first round by Brazil's Jaime Oncins. The right-hander reached his highest singles ATP-ranking on 14 June 1993, when he became the World's No. 317.

External links

1972 births
Living people
Olympic tennis players as Independent Olympic Participants
Serbian male tennis players
Tennis players at the 1992 Summer Olympics
Yugoslav male tennis players
UCLA Bruins men's tennis players